Charl Christiaan Malan (born 23 February 1989) is a former English cricketer. Malan is a right-handed batsman who bowls right-arm off break. He was born in Wandsworth in London but was educated at Paarl Boys' High School in South Africa.

While studying for his degree at Loughborough University in England, Malan made his first-class cricket debut for Loughborough UCCE against Leicestershire in 2010.  He made two further appearances for the team in 2010, against Kent and Hampshire.  The following season he played one match for the team, this time called Loughborough MCCU following a name change, against Yorkshire.

His father, Dawid Malan Sr., played first-class cricket in South Africa for Western Province and Northern Transvaal, whilst his brother, Dawid Malan, Jr. plays first-class cricket for Yorkshire and the England national team.

References

External links

1989 births
Living people
People from Wandsworth
Cricketers from Greater London
Alumni of Loughborough University
English cricketers
English people of South African descent
Loughborough MCCU cricketers